Mark Hyman may refer to:

 Mark Hyman (commentator), American political commentator
 Mark Hyman (doctor) (born 1959), American physician and writer

See also 
Marc Hyman, American screenwriter